ARA Espora (P-41) is the lead ship of the MEKO 140A16  of six corvettes built for the Argentine Navy. Commissioned in 1985, she is used for fishery patrol. She is homeported at Puerto Belgrano Naval Base and is part of the Navy's 2nd Corvette Division with her five sister ships. The ship is the sixth ship to bear the name of Colonel (Navy) Tomás Espora, who fought in the Argentine Navy during the Cisplatine War. Generator failure left her stranded in South Africa for 73 days in late 2012.

Construction 
Espora and her sister ships were part of the 1974 Naval Constructions National Plan, an initiative by the Argentine Navy to replace old World War II-vintage ships with more advanced warships. The original plan called for six MEKO 360H2 destroyers, four of them to be built in Argentina, but the plan was later modified to include four MEKO destroyers and six corvettes for anti-surface warfare and patrol operations.

Espora was built at the Río Santiago Shipyard of the Astilleros y Fábricas Navales del Estado (State Shipyards and Naval Factories) state corporation. She was launched on 23 January 1982, and officially delivered to the Navy on 5 July 1985. She was commissioned on 4 September 1985.

Service history 
Following her commissioning Espora participated in several naval exercises and conducted fishery patrol duties in the Argentine exclusive economic zone, capturing four illegal fishing ships between 1991 and 1994.

In August 2012 Espora left Puerto Belgrano to take part in the Atlasur IX naval exercise with South Africa, Brazil and Uruguay off West Africa. This deployment was necessary after the original participant from Argentina, had run aground as she left port. After completing Atlasur, Espora headed for South Africa and docked at Simonstown. The intention was to join the IBSAMAR III exercise with India, Brazil and South Africa, but Espora had made the unscheduled deployment with malfunctioning generators and these had got worse en route until they finally stopped working on 9 October. The generators needed a major overhaul, but their German manufacturer MTU refused to start work until they were paid US$450,000 to cover the cost of the work and previous invoices that had not been paid. Meanwhile, the South Africans had to reassure the Argentines that Espora would not be vulnerable like the sail training ship , which was seized in Ghana on behalf of holders of Argentina's defaulted sovereign debt. Espora finally sailed after 73 days in Simonstown, refuelled in Río de Janeiro on 4 January and arrived back in Puerto Belgrano on 10 January 2013. 

Both vessels were severely damaged.

In 2022, she again participated in an exercise off the coast of Mar del Plata with Sarandí, Robinson, the corvette  and the transport ship .

References

 Guia de los buques de la Armada Argentina 2005-2006. Ignacio Amendolara Bourdette, Editor n/a. (Spanish/English text)

Espora-class corvettes
Ships built in Argentina
1982 ships
Corvettes of Argentina
Maritime incidents in 2016